Cedarbrook is a neighborhood located in the Northwest section of the City of Philadelphia.

The Ivy Hill neighborhood is roughly the northwestern half of Cedarbrook. Ivy Hill Cemetery (established 1867) forms the geographic heart of the neighborhood. (The neighborhood most likely takes its name from the cemetery [rather than vice versa], as the area was woods and farmland when the cemetery was established.) Ivy Hill Road is sometimes mistakenly restyled as "Ivyhill Road"—most notably on its own newest street signs.

Geography

Boundaries

The boundaries of Philadelphia neighborhoods are often not official or precise. However, Cedarbrook has four precise boundaries that make it almost precisely rectangular. These are:
 Cheltenham Avenue to the northeast (a county line and city limit, beyond which lies Cheltenham Township, Montgomery County);
 Ivy Hill Road to the northwest (a county line and city limit, beyond which lies Wyndmoor, Springfield Township, Montgomery County); and
 Stenton Avenue to the southwest (a non-official intra-Philadelphia boundary, but nevertheless unequivocally dividing Cedarbrook from East Mount Airy).
 Washington Lane to the southeast (beyond which lies West Oak Lane).

ZIP code
The 19150 ZIP code corresponds almost entirely with the Cedarbrook neighborhood.

Demographics
According to the 2000 US Census, the neighborhood has a total population of 25,274. The median household income is $42,342; the median family income is $49,508. The racial makeup of the neighborhood was 2.2% White, 95.3% Black or African-American, 0.2% Alaskan or Native American, 0.0% Native Hawaiian or Pacific Islander, and 1.8% from two or more races. Hispanic or Latino of any race accounted for 1.1% of the population. Approximately 10% of the population lives below the poverty line.

Neighborhoods in Philadelphia
Olney-Oak Lane, Philadelphia